Peucetia elegans is a species of lynx spiders that is found in East India.

References 

 Peucetia elegans at the World Spider Catalog

Oxyopidae
Spiders described in 1864
Spiders of the Indian subcontinent